Mollena Williams-Haas (born 1969), formerly Mollena Williams, is an American writer, BDSM educator, actress, and former International Ms. Leather (2010).

Early life and education
She was born Mollena Lee Williams on June 20, 1969, at New York Hospital in Manhattan. Her parents, Marion and James Williams, met in 1968 while using Project TACT, one of the first dating services established in the United States.

In 1973, her father took her to see the Broadway musical Hair over her mother's objections. At the close of the show, she told her parents that she wanted to be an actor. Within three years, she obtained a professional talent agent and began a performance career.

Career
One of Williams-Haas' first performances was singing backup on the song "Lena Horne" on the soundtrack of The Wiz, a 1978 movie, in her childhood.

In 1992, she moved to Los Angeles, where she appeared in several independent films, including Skin and Bone. She co-starred in the independent cult movie America's Deadliest Home Video, developing the script in collaboration with Jack Perez. The movie is considered one of the grandfathers of "found footage" movies, predating Man Bites Dog and The Blair Witch Project. Her performance in it has been described as "brilliant."

While in Los Angeles, Williams also began exploring BDSM. She subscribed to newsletter of the Society of Janus and explored kink and fetish in what was then a newly burgeoning world of online chat forums. She has been involved with the leather subculture and BDSM since 1996.

In 2009, she was named Ms. San Francisco Leather. In 2010, she was named International Ms. Leather.

She contributed the essay "BDSM and Race Play", which was published in Rachel Kramer Bussel’s book, Best Sex Writing 2010.

In 2011, she published The Toybag Guide to Playing With Taboo.

Her short film IMPACT, which involves her participating in BDSM scenes, was released in 2012.

Also in 2012, Williams-Haas was awarded the Jack McGeorge Excellence in Education Award by Black Rose, a BDSM organization. She won the National Leather Association International’s Cynthia Slater Non-Fiction Article Award in both 2012 and 2013 for "Tables Briefly Turned" and "On Collars And Closure and Owning Myself", respectively. Also in 2013, she shared the National Leather Association International’s Geoff Mains nonfiction book award with Lee Harrington for Playing Well With Others: Your Field Guide to Discovering, Exploring and Navigating the Kink, Leather and BDSM Communities, which they co-authored.

In 2014, she was a guest on Season 1, Episode 6 of the Sunny Megatron show on Showtime, speaking on and demonstrating the fetish commonly referred to as race play.

In 2016, The New York Times published an article about her BDSM relationship with her husband Georg Friedrich Haas.

She has been inducted into the Hall of Fame of the Society of Janus, a Kink website.

Personal life
Williams-Haas is married to composer Georg Friedrich Haas, who is the dominant partner in the couple's BDSM relationship.

References 

African-American women writers
African-American writers
BDSM activists
BDSM writers
Hunter College High School alumni
Leather subculture
Living people
Sex educators
1969 births
21st-century African-American people
21st-century African-American women
20th-century African-American people
20th-century African-American women